Global Insight is an economics forecasting organization, serving over 3,800 clients in industry, finance and government, with revenues of over $95 million (in 2006) and employing more than 600 staff in 23 offices in 13 countries. It is a division of IHS Inc.

History
Global Insight was formed in March 2001 from the merger of WEFA (formerly Wharton Econometric Forecasting Associates) and DRI (formerly Data Resources Inc), together with Primark Decision Economics (later called Decision Economics, Inc.), Primark Poland (later GlobalInTech, sp. z o.o.) and the French company DAFSA; its estimated 2008 revenues were at $120 million. It has since acquired several other companies, including PlanEcon, CIEMEX, Reebie Associates, and London-based World Markets Research Centre. On November 2, 2007, Global Insight acquired SupplierBusiness.

Ownership and management
Global Insight was privately held, and founded by Joseph E. Kasputys, who served as its president and CEO. On September 18, 2008, IHS Inc. agreed to purchase Global Insight for $200 million.

See also
 Economy.com

References

External links
 IHS Global Insight web site
 SupplierBusiness web site

2001 establishments in the United States
Companies based in Massachusetts
Companies established in 2001
Macroeconomics consulting firms